Všeradov is a municipality and village in Chrudim District in the Pardubice Region of the Czech Republic. It has about 100 inhabitants.

Administrative parts
Villages of Jasné Pole and Milesimov are administrative parts of Všeradov.

References

External links

Villages in Chrudim District